William Richardson (3 June 1896–1959) was an English footballer who played in the Football League for Blackpool, Bury and Stockport County.

References

1896 births
1959 deaths
English footballers
Association football goalkeepers
English Football League players
Blackpool F.C. players
Bury F.C. players
Stockport County F.C. players
Rossendale United F.C. players